Harlansburg is a community  east of the city of New Castle in Lawrence County, Pennsylvania, United States.

The community is the home of the Harlansburg Station Transportation Museum and the Harlansburg cave, reputedly the longest cave in Pennsylvania.

The following historical text is taken from History of Lawrence County Pennsylvania, 1887, which is now in the public domain.

Harlansburg 
Is located on the old Pittsburgh and Erie stage road, which was one of the first roads laid out in the county. The road was the main stage route, and travel over it, after the country had become partially settled, was very heavy. The first settler at the place was Jonathan Harlan, who left Chester County in 1792, and came to Allegheny county, locating in the beautiful Chartiers valley. He was in that county during the excitement caused by the "whisky insurrection" of 1794, and was in the neighborhood when Gen. John Neville's house was burnt by the insurrectionists He came to what is now called Scott Township, about 1797-8, and settled  under Dr. Peter Mowry, of Pittsburgh, including the site of the village. He afterwards removed to the farm now owned by the heirs of George McCracken. While living on his first tract he laid out the town of Harlansburg in 1800, built the first house in the place, and put up a gristmill just east of the village, on the small run which empties into Slippery Rock Creek, some distance below, the mill being built probably previous to the laying out of the town. The house he built was constructed of round logs, and stood on the hill just above where the "Benard House" now stands. The house was standing until about 1840.

When Mr. Harlan came to the place he brought with him his wife and three children, and seven children were afterwards added to the number, the first born after their settlement being a daughter, Sarah. After Mr. Harlan removed to the farm, below town, he built a second grist-mill, already mentioned.

About the same time Harlan came Abraham and Levi Hunt made a settlement on a farm adjoining him, and Abraham Hunt, in 1802, built the first tavern in the village, the building still standing, and known as the "Benard House." It was the first frame building for many miles around, and has been used as a tavern ever since it was erected. The HUNTs afterward removed to a farm in the neighborhood or where the Deans now live, a couple of miles west of the village.

William Elder came to Harlansburg about 1807-8, two or three years after his father, John Elder, settled in the township. He soon after opened a small general store, in a space of about five by ten feet, where the bar now is in the "Benard House." A postoffice was established in the village, probably about 1811-12, and Mr. Elder also had the honor of being the first postmaster, so far as can be learned from those who remember.

John Bently came from Chester county in 1814, and, with his wife and six children - five boys and a girl - located in the village. Robert Bently, Esq., the oldest son, has lived within three miles (5 km) of the place ever since, and is now living in the village.

A log school house was erected about 1820, and the first teacher was an Irishman named David Gourley. Before this, schools had been kept in private houses. Joseph Campbell taught a small school in his own house about 1815-16, and James McCune always kept one in his house. In the winter of 1818, William Jack taught a school east of town, in a house which was built by John Martin for a dwelling.

During the winter of 1818-19, snow fell to the depth of twenty-six inches, and unless the snow of the present winter equals it, the like has not been known since. So say the "old residents."

A two-story brick school house was built on the hill, in the western part of the village, in the neighborhood of 1857, and is still standing. The school has been run as a high-school most of the time since, and, at present, has an average attendance of about one hundred.

A hewn log church was built by some German families as early as 1799. Among the churches next in age is the Methodist Episcopal Church, which was originated in 1834. The first church building was a frame structure put up for a dwelling by John Boyd. The third church in age was a Cumberland Presbyterian church, which was organized about 1836. The congregation became so small that they ceased to meet as a church congregation in 1865. The U.P. church, a short distance from the village, was built in 1855, although the congregation was organized about 1852. The building is a brick one. The Cumberland Presbyterians sold their church to the Presbyterians who organized a congregation in Harlansburg about 1875. The first blacksmith shop was started by John SMITH, in 1816, south of the village. The first one in town was started by Jesse Bentley, in 1831. Charles Book operated the first wagon shop in 1862. Ira Emerson opened the first boot and shoe shop, which James Sturling had the first tailor shop in 1833. Fairs were held until some ten years ago, when the company dissolved. The population of Harlansburg is about two hundred. A railroad which would develop the coal and mineral lands in this neighborhood would be great value to the growth of the town.

Ramsey Brothers

The present firm organized in April, 1887, when David G., and Richard M. Ramsey purchased the general merchandise of J.G. Jordan at Harlansburg. The brothers are sons of Richard Ramsey, deceased, 1861. The brothers are natives of Plaingrove township, where they were raised and attended school. David G., was born October 4, 1853, while Richard M., was born on May 3, 1857. David was married to Miss Nettie Cunningham, September 2, 1878, and is the father of four children, all at home. Richard was married January 31, 1884, to Miss Lida Brown, and is the father of two children. Ramsey Brother's store is well stocked with dry goods, notions, boots, shoes, groceries, and everything usually found in a first-class general merchandise store. They carry an unusually large stock which they sell at the very lowest possible prices. The Ramsey Brothers have been long known in this part of the county as careful and honest business men, whom it is always safe to patronize.

James Burnside

Was born May 11, 1818, in Slipperyrock Township, one mile (1.6 km) and a half from Princeton. His father was Samuel Bunrside, deceased, who came to this country from Ireland in 1817. In 1868 James Burnside came to Harlansburg and bought the hotel property from Michael and Henry Jordan. Mr. Burnside has thus been in the hotel business in Harlansburg for nearly twenty years. He was married in 1848 to Catherine Howe, of Butler County and to them ten children were born, seven of whom are living as follows: Samuel H., married, of Harlansburg; Robert F., at home; Fannie Glass, of Harlansburg; John A., James E., William H., and Joseph P., all at home. Mr. and Mrs. Burnside are a pleasant old couple. They run a good hotel and are well thought of by all who know them.

Other businessmen include:
John Eppinger, the blacksmith, has been in the village many years and is a good workman.

Brown & Caldwell, the general merchants, purchased the general store of David Ramsey, in 1886, and have been running it ever since.

J.J. Ramsey, who was the former partner of J.G. Jordan in the general merchandise business, has the only drug store in town and does a good business.

Washington Cunningham, the furniture dealer and undertaker, has been in Harlansburg over sixty-five years and has been in the business the most of that time.

References

External links
History of Lawrence County Pennsylvania, 1887
 Historical Bituminous coal seam, mining and permit data for Harlansburg, PA Quadrangle

Unincorporated communities in Pennsylvania
Unincorporated communities in Lawrence County, Pennsylvania